Canada Dry was the nickname for two Canadian Forces bases in Doha, Qatar during the first Gulf War. The two bases, named Canada Dry One (10 km outside Doha) and Canada Dry Two, housed land and air elements (CF18 - Desert Cats).

Canada Dry is the name of a brand of ginger ale that originated in Canada.

Units stationed at the base included:

 409 Nighthawks - CF-18 fighters
 416 Lynxes - CF-18 fighters
 439 Tigers - Tactical Fighter Squadron - CF-18 fighters
 Mike Company, 3rd Battalion, The Royal Canadian Regiment

A number of CF-18 fighters were stationed in the bases and flew sorties for the coalition.

A Boeing CC-137 Husky tanker from 437 Transport Squadron also flew at the base to provide refueling for the CF-18 fighters.

See also
 Camp Julien
 Camp Mirage

References

External links
 Thistle, Rich. CF-18 Hornets in the Gulf War. Rich Thistle Art Studio.
 409 Squadron. Forty Years - 4 Wing Canadian Forces Base Baden Soellingen.

Air force installations of Canada
Military installations closed in the 1990s
Canada–Qatar relations